NRCS may refer to:

 National Rail Chaplaincy Service, UK
 National Red Cross/Crescent Societies, the collected national branches of the worldwide aid charity
 National Regulator for Compulsory Specifications, an agency of the South African Government Department of Trade and Industry
 National Replacement Character Set, a character set for computer terminals
 Natural Resources Conservation Service, a US government agency
 Nepal Red Cross Society, an aid charity
 Nigerian Red Cross Society, an aid charity